Kim Myong-hyok (born 3 December 1990) is a North Korean weightlifter. A two-time World Championship bronze medalist, he also competed for North Korea at the 2012 Summer Olympics.

References

North Korean male weightlifters
Weightlifters at the 2012 Summer Olympics
Weightlifters at the 2016 Summer Olympics
Olympic weightlifters of North Korea
1990 births
World Weightlifting Championships medalists
Living people
Weightlifters at the 2014 Asian Games
Asian Games medalists in weightlifting
Asian Games silver medalists for North Korea

Medalists at the 2014 Asian Games
Universiade medalists in weightlifting
Weightlifters at the 2018 Asian Games
Universiade silver medalists for North Korea
20th-century North Korean people
21st-century North Korean people